is a Japanese football player.

Playing career
Hayashi was born in Kagoshima Prefecture on 27 August 1999. He joined J2 League club Kamatamare Sanuki in 2018.

References

External links

1999 births
Living people
Association football people from Kagoshima Prefecture
Japanese footballers
J2 League players
Kamatamare Sanuki players
Association football midfielders